The East Moreton colonial by-election, 1860 was a by-election held on 27 October 1860 in the electoral district of East Moreton for the Queensland Legislative Assembly.

History
On 29 September 1860, Henry Buckley, member for East Moreton, resigned. Thomas Warry won the resulting by-election on 27 October 1860.

See also
 Members of the Queensland Legislative Assembly, 1860–1863

References

1860 elections in Australia
Queensland state by-elections
1860s in Queensland